Bruno Fontes Ferreira da Silva (born 25 September 1979 in Curitiba) is a Brazilian sailor. Born in Paraná but raised in Santa Catarina, he started sailing at the age of 8 in Florianópolis. Most of his success came in the men's laser class, appearing in two Olympic Games, 27th place at the 2008 Summer Olympics and in 13th place at the 2012 Summer Olympics.

Achievements
 Silver medalist at the 2019 Pan American Games
 Six time Brazilian champion (2006/08/09/10/11/15)
 South American champion (2008)
 Gold and Silver at the South American Games

References

External links 

 Bruno Fontes at the 2019 Pan American Games
 
 

1979 births
Living people
Brazilian male sailors (sport)
Olympic sailors of Brazil
Sailors at the 2008 Summer Olympics – Laser
Sailors at the 2012 Summer Olympics – Laser
South American Games silver medalists for Brazil
South American Games medalists in sailing
Competitors at the 2010 South American Games
Pan American Games medalists in sailing
Pan American Games silver medalists for Brazil
Sailors at the 2011 Pan American Games
Sailors at the 2015 Pan American Games
Sailors at the 2019 Pan American Games
Medalists at the 2019 Pan American Games
Sportspeople from Santa Catarina (state)
20th-century Brazilian people
21st-century Brazilian people